The Texas Rangers 2003 season involved the Rangers finishing 4th in the American League West with a record of 71 wins and 91 losses.

Preseason
October 3, 2002: John Rocker was released by the Rangers.
December 6, 2002: Travis Hafner and Aaron Myette was traded by the Rangers to the Cleveland Indians for Einar Díaz and Ryan Drese.
December 23, 2002: Ugueth Urbina was signed as a free agent with the Rangers.

Regular season

Opening Day starters
Einar Díaz, C
Rafael Palmeiro, 1B
Michael Young, 2B
Hank Blalock, 3B
Alex Rodriguez, SS
Carl Everett, LF
Doug Glanville, CF
Juan González, RF
Rubén Sierra, DH
Ismael Valdez, RHP

Season standings

Record vs. opponents

Transactions
 May 9, 2003: Alan Benes was sent to the Texas Rangers by the Chicago Cubs as part of a conditional deal.
 June 3, 2003: Ian Kinsler was drafted by the Rangers in the 17th round of the 2003 amateur draft. Player signed June 24, 2003.
July 11, 2003: Ugueth Urbina was traded by the Rangers to the Florida Marlins for Adrián González, Ryan Snare, and Will Smith (minors).

Roster

Player stats

Batting

Starters by position
Note: Pos = Position; G = Games played; AB = At bats; H = Hits; Avg. = Batting average; HR = Home runs; RBI = Runs batted in

Other batters
Note: G = Games played; AB = At bats; H = Hits; Avg. = Batting average; HR = Home runs; RBI = Runs batted in

Pitching

Starting pitchers
Note: G = Games pitched; IP = Innings pitched; W = Wins; L = Losses; ERA = Earned run average; SO = Strikeouts

Other pitchers
Note: G = Games pitched; IP = Innings pitched; W = Wins; L = Losses; ERA = Earned run average; SO = Strikeouts

Relief pitchers
Note: G = Games pitched; W = Wins; L = Losses; SV = Saves; ERA = Earned run average; SO = Strikeouts

Awards and honors
Alex Rodriguez, American League Most Valuable Player Award
Alex Rodriguez, Hank Aaron Award
Alex Rodriguez, A.L. Home Run Champ
Alex Rodriguez, SS, AL Gold Glove
Alex Rodriguez, Silver Slugger Award

All-Star Game

Farm system

LEAGUE CHAMPIONS: Spokane

References

2003 Texas Rangers team page at Baseball Reference
2003 Texas Rangers team page at www.baseball-almanac.com

Texas Rangers seasons
Range
Texas Rangers